The pink-billed lark (Spizocorys conirostris) is a species of lark in the family Alaudidae found in southern Africa.
Its natural habitat is subtropical or tropical dry lowland grassland.

Taxonomy and systematics
The pink-billed lark was originally classified within the genus Alauda. Some authorities have placed the pink-billed lark in the genus Calandrella.

Subspecies 
Six subspecies are recognized: 
 Damara pink-billed lark (S. c. damarensis) - Roberts, 1922: Alternately named Kenya short-toed lark (a name also used by the Athi short-toed lark). Found in north-western Namibia
 S. c. crypta - (Irwin, 1957): Found in north-eastern Botswana
 S. c. makawai - (Traylor, 1962): Found in western Zambia
 S. c. harti - (Benson, 1964): Found in south-western Zambia
 S. c. barlowi - Roberts, 1942: Found in southern Namibia, southern Botswana and north-western South Africa
 S. c. conirostris - (Sundevall, 1850): Found in south-eastern Botswana, northern, central and eastern South Africa

References

External links

 Species text - The Atlas of Southern African Birds

pink-billed lark
Birds of Southern Africa
pink-billed lark
Taxonomy articles created by Polbot